Li–Fraumeni syndrome is a rare, autosomal dominant, hereditary disorder that predisposes carriers to cancer development. It was named after two American physicians, Frederick Pei Li and Joseph F. Fraumeni, Jr., who first recognized the syndrome after reviewing the medical records and death certificates of 648 childhood rhabdomyosarcoma patients. This syndrome is also known as the sarcoma, breast, leukaemia and adrenal gland (SBLA) syndrome.

The syndrome is linked to germline mutations of the p53 tumor suppressor gene, which encodes a transcription factor (p53) that normally regulates the cell cycle and prevents genomic mutations. The mutations can be inherited, or can arise from mutations early in embryogenesis, or in one of the parent's germ cells.

Presentation

Li–Fraumeni syndrome is characterized by early onset of cancer, a wide variety of types of cancers, and development of multiple cancers throughout one's life.

Pathology

LFS1: Mutations in TP53
 Normal conditions: TP53 is a tumor suppressor gene on chromosome 17 that normally assists in the control of cell division and growth through action on the normal cell cycle. TP53 typically become expressed due to cellular stressors, such as DNA damage, and can halt the cell cycle to assist with either the repair of repairable DNA damage, or can induce apoptosis of a cell with irreparable damage. The repair of "bad" DNA, or the apoptosis of a cell, prevents the proliferation of damaged cells.
 Mutant conditions: Mutations of TP53 can inhibit its normal function, and allow cells with damaged DNA to continue to divide. If these DNA mutations are left unchecked, some cells can divide uncontrollably, forming tumors (cancers). Further mutations in the DNA could lead to malignant cells that can travel to, and develop cancer in, different areas of the body. Many individuals with Li–Fraumeni syndrome have been shown to be heterozygous for a TP53 mutation. Recent studies have shown that 60% to 80% of classic LFS families harbor detectable germ-line TP53 mutations, the majority of which are missense mutations in the DNA-binding domain. These missense mutations cause a decrease in the ability of p53 to bind to DNA, thus inhibiting the normal TP53 mechanism.
 Unique Brazilian mutation: Although other mutations leading to Li–Fraumeni syndrome have been found outside the DNA-binding domain, a mutation at codon 337 of the tetramerization domain of TP53 has shown a particularly high frequency. The tetramerization domain plays a major role in the oligomerization of the p53 protein, which exists as a tetramer. This mutation has only been found in Brazilian families, and is located in exon 10 of the TP53 gene. The mutation causes an amino acid change from arginine to histidine at codon 337. With pH in the low to normal physiological range (up to 7.5), the mutant protein forms normal oligomers and retains its suppressor function. However, at a high physiological pH, p53 is unable to assemble into a tetramer. This unique feature may contribute to why families with this particular mutation often show incomplete penetrance.
 Dominant negative mutations: Most individuals with Li–Fraumeni syndrome are heterozygous for a mutant TP53 gene, and some p53 mutants can inhibit the function of the wild-type p53 in a dominant negative manner. Mutated p53 proteins are typically more stable than wild-type, and can inhibit the activity of the wild-type protein in suppressing cell proliferation and in inducing cell cycle arrest. Due to the mutant p53 being able to inhibit some wild-type p53, damaged cells are at an even greater susceptibility to proliferate and become transformed, resulting in cancer.

LFS2: mutations in CHEK2

Another variant of Li–Fraumeni that remains somewhat controversial, is a mutation of the CHEK2 (or CHK2) gene. CHK2 is also a tumor suppressor gene; it regulates the action of p53 and is activated by ATM, which detects DNA damage, and in this way, DNA damage information can be conveyed to p53 to indirectly arrest the cell cycle at that point for DNA repair to be able to take place or to cause apoptosis (programmed cell death).

LFS-L:

Families who do not conform to the criteria of classical Li–Fraumeni syndrome have been termed "LFS-like". LFS-like individuals generally do not have any detectable p53 mutations, and tend to be diagnosed on either the Birch or Eeles criteria.

A third locus has been mapped to the long arm of chromosome 1 (1q23), but no gene has yet been identified.

Another locus that has been linked to this syndrome is CDKN2A-CDKN2B.

Clinical

The classical LFS malignancies—sarcoma, cancers of the breast, brain, and adrenal glands—comprise about 80% of all cancers that occur in this syndrome.

The risk of developing any invasive cancer (excluding skin cancer) is about 50% by age 30 (1% in the general population) and is 90% by age 70. Early-onset breast cancer accounts for 25% of all the cancers in this syndrome. This is followed by soft-tissue sarcomas (20%), bone sarcoma (15%), and brain tumors—especially glioblastomas—(13%). Other tumours seen in this syndrome include leukemia, lymphoma, and adrenocortical carcinoma.

About 90% of females with LFS develop breast cancer by age 60 years; the majority of these occur before age 45 years. Females with this syndrome have almost a 100% lifetime risk of developing cancer. This compares with 73% for affected males. The difference may be due to much smaller breast tissue in males and increased estrogen levels in females.

The risks of sarcoma, female breast cancer, and haematopoietic malignancies in mutation carriers are more than 100 times greater than those seen in the general population.

Other tumours reported in this syndrome, but not yet proved to be linked with it, include melanoma, Wilms' and other kidney tumors, hepatocellular carcinoma, gonadal germ cell, pancreatic, gastric, choroid plexus, colorectal, and prostate cancers.

Around 80% of children with adrenocortical carcinoma and 2–10% of childhood brain tumors have p53 mutations. About 2–3% of osteosarcomas, 9% of rhabdomyosarcomas, and 7–20% of patients with multiple primary tumours have p53 mutations.

Although most cases of this syndrome have early onset of cancer, cases have also been reported later in life.

Diagnosis

Li–Fraumeni syndrome is diagnosed if these three criteria are met:
 The patient has been diagnosed with a sarcoma at a young age (below 45).
 A first-degree relative has been diagnosed with any cancer at a young age (below 45).
 Another first- or a second-degree relative has been diagnosed with any cancer at a young age (below 45) or with a sarcoma at any age.

Other criteria have also been proposed:
 A proband with any childhood cancer or sarcoma, brain tumor or adrenal cortical carcinoma diagnosed before age 45
 A first- or second-degree relative with a typical LFS malignancy (sarcoma, leukaemia, or cancers of the breast, brain or adrenal cortex) regardless of age at diagnosis
 A first- or second-degree relative with any cancer diagnosed before age 60

A third criterion has been proposed:
 Two first- or second-degree relatives with LFS-related malignancies at any age.

Management

Genetic counseling and genetic testing are used to confirm that somebody has this gene mutation. Once such a person is identified, early and regular screenings for cancer are recommended for them as people with Li–Fraumeni are likely to develop another primary malignancy at a future time (57% within 30 years of diagnosis).

Chompret criteria

A 2015 revision of the traditional Chompret criteria for screening has been proposed—a proband who has:
 A tumor belonging to LFS tumor spectrum (e.g., premenopausal breast cancer, soft tissue sarcoma, osteosarcoma, CNS tumor, adrenocortical carcinoma) before age 46 years, and at least one first- or second-degree relative with LFS tumor (except breast cancer if the proband has breast cancer) before age 56 years or with multiple tumors at any age
 Multiple tumors (except multiple breast tumors), two of which belong to LFS spectrum with the initial cancer occurring before the age of 46 years
 An adrenocortical carcinoma, choroid plexus tumor, or rhabdomyosarcoma of embryonal anaplastic subtype, at any age of onset, irrespective of family history
 Breast cancer before age 31

Recommendations
Recommendations for individuals from families affected by the syndrome include:
 Avoidance of radiation therapy to reduce risk of secondary radiation-induced malignancies
 Children and adults undergo comprehensive annual physical examination
 Women undergo age-specific breast cancer monitoring beginning at age 25 years
 All patients consult a physician promptly for evaluation of lingering symptoms and illnesses

Suggestions
 Adults should undergo routine screening for colorectal cancer beginning no later than age 25 years.
 Individuals should undergo organ-targeted surveillance based on the pattern of cancer observed in their families.
 Prophylactic mastectomy to reduce the risk of breast cancer is an option.

Epidemiology

Li–Fraumeni syndrome (LFS) is rare; as of 2011, cases had been reported in more than 500 families. The syndrome was discovered using an epidemiological approach. Li and Fraumeni identified four families in which siblings or cousins of rhabdomyosarcoma patients had a childhood sarcoma, which suggested a familial cancer syndrome. Identification of TP53s the gene affected by mutation was suggested by the same approach. Over half of the cancers in LFS families had been previously associated with inactivating mutations of the p53 gene and in one primary research study, DNA sequencing in samples taken from five Li–Fraumeni syndrome families showed autosomal dominant inheritance of a mutated TP53 gene.

See also
 OSLAM syndrome

References

Further reading
 Li–Fraumeni Syndrome by Katherine Schneider, MPH, Kristin Zelley, MS, Kim E Nichols, MD and Judy Garber, MD, MPH, in GeneReviews, a section of GeneTests, published online by the University of Washington with funds from the National Institutes of Health
 Li–Fraumeni syndrome, in the National Library of Medicine
 Li–Fraumeni syndrome; LFS1, entry in Online Mendelian Inheritance in Man (OMIM), published by Johns Hopkins University and the National Institutes of Health

Cancer
DNA replication and repair-deficiency disorders
Hereditary cancers
Rare diseases
Single-nucleotide polymorphism associated disease
Syndromes with tumors
Transcription factor deficiencies